Kobylin-Borzymy  is a village in Wysokie Mazowieckie County, Podlaskie Voivodeship, in north-eastern Poland. It is the seat of the gmina (administrative district) called Gmina Kobylin-Borzymy.

References

Villages in Wysokie Mazowieckie County
Podlachian Voivodeship
Łomża Governorate
Białystok Voivodeship (1919–1939)
Belastok Region